The Country Day School (CDS) is an independent, non-profit, preparatory, co-educational day school in King City, Ontario, Canada. It was founded in 1972.

CDS is a member of Canadian Accredited Independent Schools (CAIS) and the Conference of Independent Schools of Ontario (CIS Ontario). Its Head of School is John Liggett.

Overview
Serving male and female students from junior kindergarten to grade 12, it has set a maximum class size of 24 students with an average of 17 students per. Each student is subject to an entrance assessment: an informal process for young children or the more formal Canadian Achievement Test for older students.

The school is divided into a Junior School (JK-6), Middle School (7–8), and Senior School (9–12). CDS competes in CIS Athletic Association (CISAA) sports each term, particularly soccer, rugby, track and field, hockey, basketball, softball, baseball, volleyball, and cross country.

Being a private, independent school CDS charges a yearly fee of $27,100 for students in grades 1 to 12, and $23,350 for kindergarten students.

Campus
The school is situated on over 100 acres and has three full-sized gymnasiums, an athletics track, two softball diamonds, five full-size fields, and three smaller fields. One full-size field is synthetic turf, and one of the small fields has synthetic turf and is covered with a dome for all-season access. The school also has a performing arts centre with a 350-seat theatre, practice rooms, and an atrium.

In February 2016, it opened a  two-storey building for the senior school and administration offices which was funded by $10 million raised through the "Making Connections" campaign. It contains nine classrooms, administration offices, a dining hall, and learning centres.

Notable alumni

Mike Cammalleri, NHL hockey player
Elvis Stojko, figure skater
Adriana Leon, soccer player
Alexandra Paul, figure skater
Victor Mete, NHL hockey player
Jakob Chychrun, NHL hockey player
Barclay Goodrow, NHL hockey player
JP Saxe, Musician

References

External links
 

Education in King, Ontario
Educational institutions established in 1972
Elementary schools in the Regional Municipality of York
High schools in the Regional Municipality of York
1972 establishments in Ontario
Private schools in Ontario